Lima Memorial Health System was founded in 1899 as Lima City Hospital by the citizens of the Lima, Ohio community. The hospital is a not-for-profit health care organization with more than 1,500 employees, and 25 facilities in their 10-county service area in the region.  Lima Memorial Health System also offers an extended network of primary care, pediatric and specialist physicians in their Lima Memorial Physicians (LMP) group.  The hospital is an affiliate of ProMedica.

See also
ProMedica Health System
The Toledo Hospital
Toledo Children's Hospital
Flower Hospital

References

External links

Lima, Ohio
Healthcare in Ohio
Hospital networks in the United States
Medical and health organizations based in Ohio
Trauma centers